Philip James Bone (29 January 1873 – 17 June 1964) was an English mandolinist and guitar player in the late 19th and early 20th centuries.

Life
Bone was born and died in Luton. He studied guitar and mandolin with G. B. Marchiso at Trinity College of Music, London. Making fast progress, he was chosen to perform Beethoven's Sonata and Adagio for mandolin and piano at a college recital. He was also the founder and conductor of the Luton Mandolin Orchestra, "probably the first British mandolin orchestra to play on the mainland of Europe", conducted in Paris in 1909. In 1951, he became president of the British Federation of Banjoists, Mandolinists and Guitarists.

While his day-to-day work was as a teacher and music dealer, he is remembered today as the author of the book The Guitar and Mandolin: Biographies of Celebrated Players and Composers for These Instruments, published by Schott and Augener (London, 1914). He was also a Medallist, Fellow of the Royal Society of Arts, London. Other honours given him include being a medallist at the International Music Contests in Bologne, medallist in the International Music Contest in France (1st Prize Honours), and medalist of the I.U.M. in London. He conducted of the Luton Mandolin Orchestra.

His book The Guitar and Mandolin is a comprehensive look at the composers and players of these two instruments up to 1914. He advertised his book on his company letterhead in 1915, saying it was "the only compendium of invaluable information concerning these instruments", and "lives of 300 of the most celebrated players and composers. Facts hitherto unpublished." In writing the book, Bone did not include people living at the time, as he felt that it was the job of future historians to decide who would be notable. The book contains biographies for composers and musicians throughout western Europe. Many of those in his book who were prominent have been forgotten today, and the book has information not readily available elsewhere. Later in 1953, Bone wrote to Vahdah Olcott-Bickford, who had assisted him with his book. He told her he had continued the research since his book was printed and was trying to get another edition published with his new information. He was having difficulty finding a publisher willing to take a risk on a new edition.

List of biographies in The Guitar and Mandolin

See also
 BMG movement

References

External links
Online book, The Guitar and Mandolin by Philip J. Bone.
Short review of Bones' book. Talks about some of what he got right and wrong.

1873 births
1964 deaths
People from Luton
English classical guitarists
English male guitarists
British mandolinists
English music historians
British biographers

Adolf Ledhuy